Samba Yonga is a Zambian journalist and media consultant.  She has worked a long time as editor for Big Issue Zambia and has written for several other publications.  Yonga is the founder of Ku-Atenga Media, a media consultancy firm and was named one of Destiny's "Power of 40" most influential women in Africa in 2017.

Career 
Samba Yonga first became interested in journalism after she won a prize for a short story she had written.  She attended college and whilst there worked part-time for a local newspaper.  After graduation Yonga found work developing ideas for TV and radio programmes.  She was then appointed to run the relaunched Trendsetters youth magazine.  Yonga has also written for Okay Africa magazine and The Guardian.  Yonga was editorial director of The Big Issue Zambia magazine, which was launched by the International Network of Street Papers in 2007.  The magazine was published in six countries and Yonga travelled frequently to visit these.

Yonga established a media consultancy company, Ku-Atenga Media, from the word for "to create" in Luvale, her native language.  Shortly afterwards, she left Zambia to study for a master's degree in global media and translation communication at the University of London.  Upon her return, she began to expand Ku-Atenga, providing consultancy services on communications strategy.  The company now carries out work for local and international clients, including the Zambian government, European Union and the United Nations.

Yonga began the Narratives of Silenced Voices to research and publish the stories of African women from history. Yonga developed the project into the Zambian Museum of Women's History, initially as an online-only offering but with a view to having a physical location to allow display of artefacts collected by the project.

Yonga writes a blog on WordPress. She was named one of Destiny's "Power of 40" most influential women in Africa of 2017.

References 

Living people
Zambian journalists
Zambian women journalists
21st-century Zambian writers
21st-century Zambian women writers
People from Lusaka
Year of birth missing (living people)